The 2009–10 season was Southampton's fifth consecutive season in The Football League and their first season in League One. Having been relegated the previous season, Southampton looked to reclaim their place in the Championship by being promoted in 2009–10. On 28 March 2010, The Saints won the League Trophy for the first time, defeating Carlisle United 4–1 at Wembley. On 25 April, however, Southampton's hopes of a playoff place were ended after Huddersfield Town beat bottom-place side Stockport County 6–0 to claim the final place. The Saints eventually finished in 7th position, just one place and seven points below the play-offs.

Administration and change of ownership
The club ended the previous season with its parent company, Southampton Leisure Holdings PLC in administration. As a result the club entered the 2009–10 season with a ten-point deduction imposed by The Football League.

On 8 July 2009 the administrators confirmed that the club had been sold to a buyer "owned and controlled by Markus Liebherr". On 9 July 2009 Mark Wotte was sacked as Head Coach with Stewart Henderson taking temporary charge. The club confirmed that the search for the new manager had already begun. They said in a statement that the decision is part of a wider strategic plan being implemented to improve all aspects of the club's operations, both on and off the field.

On 17 July 2009 the club confirmed the appointment of Alan Pardew as the new First Team Manager. On the opening day of the season Saints forced a 1–1 draw against Millwall, with Matthew Paterson netting the club's first goal in League One. Following this, the Saints made their first big signing under Markus Liebherr as they unveiled new striker Rickie Lambert who was purchased on 10 August 2009, for an initial £800,000, which could rise to £1m subject to appearances, from fellow League One side Bristol Rovers.

Liebherr also brought in Italian businessman Nicola Cortese to look after the club's business interests on his behalf.

As well as Rickie Lambert, Pardew was given the funds to complete a string of other signings to rebuild the squad including: Dean Hammond, Radhi Jaïdi, Graeme Murty, Dan Harding, David Connolly, Michail Antonio, Papa Waigo, Lee Barnard, José Fonte, Danny Seaborne, Jon Otsemobor and Jason Puncheon, meaning that by the end of the January transfer window, Southampton had spent over £3 million on players, a significantly larger amount than any other League one club.

Pre-season

League One

Pld = Matches played; W = Matches won; D = Matches drawn; L = Matches lost; GF = Goals for; GA = Goals against; GD = Goal difference; Pts = Points

*Note: Southampton were docked ten points at the beginning of the season for breaching insolvency regulations.

FA Cup

League Cup

League Trophy

Squad statistics

Most appearances

Top goalscorers

Transfers

References

2009-10
2009–10 Football League One by team